The Black Windmill is a 1974 British spy thriller film directed by Don Siegel and starring Michael Caine, John Vernon, Janet Suzman and Donald Pleasence. It was produced by Richard D. Zanuck and David Brown.

Plot
Two schoolboys are playing with a model plane on an abandoned military base in the English countryside. They are approached by two RAF personnel who rebuke them for trespassing, and take them to see their commanding officer. It soon becomes apparent that they are not really in the military and the two boys are kidnapped.

In London a British intelligence officer, Major Tarrant, is engaged in an undercover operation to try to infiltrate a gang of arms smugglers – who are selling weapons to terrorists in Northern Ireland. He makes an initial approach with Celia Burrows, a member of the organisation. He arranges to come back the next week to meet her boss. He then heads to a large country house, where the head of MI6 Sir Edward Julyan lives, and makes a report about his operation to Julyan and his direct superior, Cedric Harper. While he is there he receives a telephone call from his wife – who tells him their son David has been taken and she has received a strange phone call. Tarrant reacts calmly, revealing to his superiors only that he has a family problem, and is given permission to leave.

Tarrant goes to his wife's home in time to receive a second call from a man identifying himself as Drabble. Drabble demonstrates he knows exactly who Tarrant is and what jobs he does. He instructs him to get Harper to answer the next phone call – making it clear he has Tarrant's son David and is prepared to torture him. Tarrant goes to Harper, and informs him of the situation. Harper agrees to take the phone call and begins to put a surveillance operation into motion – to discover the identity of Drabble. When Drabble gets in touch, he demands that Harper give him £500,000 in uncut diamonds and make a rendezvous in Paris. Harper had recently acquired that exact amount of diamonds to fund another operation he has planned. Harper deduces that Drabble must be acting with information supplied by a member of British intelligence. He immediately begins to suspect Tarrant of staging the kidnapping, and has him placed under observation. Tarrant, meanwhile, has to assign his arms-smuggling case to another officer.

The Drabble gang have placed incriminating evidence into Tarrant's flat, which appears to show a relationship with Celia Burrows, and this is found by Scotland Yard officers conducting a search. This further fuels Harper's belief that Tarrant has in fact arranged the entire kidnapping himself. Harper meets with Tarrant in his office and tells him that he cannot allow the ransom to be met, as the British government does not negotiate with terrorists. Tarrant seemingly accepts this, but when Harper has departed, he breaks into his office and impersonates Harper on a secure telephone – arranging to have the diamonds made available. He then takes them to Paris to make the rendezvous – giving the slip to the tail Harper has placed on him. In Paris he is met by Celia Burrows at the rendezvous. She takes him to a building where it is claimed Tarrant's son is being held.

It soon becomes apparent to Tarrant that Drabble has not got his son there. Instead Drabble makes a cryptic reference to a place in Southern England where there is a view of two windmills. Once he has got the diamonds the ruthless Drabble murders Celia Burrows, and leaves an unconscious Tarrant lying beside the corpse. Tarrant is arrested by the French police – and handed over to Harper and British intelligence. A rescue is then staged by Drabble gang, freeing Tarrant from Harper's custody, but then trying to murder him. Tarrant manages to escape and head back to England. He realises that Drabble meant to try to silence him for good – therefore protecting whoever in British intelligence was supplying him from information. Tarrant then attempts to flush out the traitor, by pretending to be Drabble and arranging a rendezvous at the two windmills with various senior British officers which he now knows to be the Clayton Windmills near Brighton.

The man who comes to the rendezvous is Sir Edward Julyan who is ambushed by Tarrant. Under duress he admits that he arranged the whole thing as he urgently needed large amounts of money to enjoy a comfortable retirement with his free-spending wife. He tries to get Tarrant to accept half the value of the diamonds, but he refuses – and instead demands to know the whereabouts of his son. Julyan tells him that he is being held in the black windmill by Drabble. Tarrant then storms the windmill and rescues his son, killing Drabble and his henchman. He carries David out of the windmill and along the road singing "Underneath the spreading chestnut tree" to him.

Cast

 Michael Caine as Major John Tarrant
 Donald Pleasence as Cedric Harper
 Joseph O'Conor as Sir Edward Julyan
 John Vernon as McKee
 Janet Suzman as Alex Tarrant
 Delphine Seyrig as Ceil Burrows
 Joss Ackland as Chief Superintendent Wray
 Clive Revill as Alf Chestermann
 Catherine Schell as Lady Melissa Julyan
 Denis Quilley as Bateson
 Edward Hardwicke as Mike McCarthy
 Paul Moss as David Tarrant
 Derek Newark as Policeman monitoring Tarrant's phone
 Maureen Pryor as Mrs Harper
 Joyce Carey as Harper's Secretary
 Preston Lockwood as Ilkeston, bank manager
 Molly Urquhart as Margaret
 David Daker as MI5 man
 Hermione Baddeley as Hetty
 Patrick Barr as General St John
 Russell Napier as Admiral Ballantyne (uncredited)
 Robert Dorning as Jeweller (uncredited)
 John Rhys-Davies as Fake military policeman (uncredited)

Production

Writing
The screenplay by Leigh Vance is based on Clive Egleton's 1973 novel Seven Days to a Killing. The story involves a British secret service agent, John Tarrant (Caine), involved in the investigation of an international arms syndicate. Tarrant's son is kidnapped and held to ransom, leading Tarrant to discover that he cannot even rely on the people on his own side.

Filming
The film was made, in part, on location at Clayton Windmills, south of Burgess Hill, in West Sussex, England. It also featured scenes filmed at Aldwych and Shepherd's Bush tube stations. Also The Red Lion public house in the Duke of York Street A section of the film was also shot at Pegwell Bay, Ramsgate Hoverport, where Tarrant makes his way across the channel and sneaks onto the back of a bus which is on board the hovercraft Sure. At the end of the film it is stated that the film was shot on location in England and France and completed at Twickenham Film Studios, Middlesex, England.

Reception
On the website Rotten Tomatoes, the film has a 29% rating.

A review in the  New York Times gave the film a mixed reaction describing it as a "thoroughly professional job" but criticising its lack of invention and the failure of Caine's character to demonstrate any emotion about his son's kidnapping. Donald Pleasence's performance as the fastidious Harper was praised. It concluded "in the age of Watergate, we need nimbler or more fantastic material to engage us — to grab our attention from wondering what may be on the news tonight".

The film opened at the Radio City Music Hall in New York City on 16 May 1974 and grossed $151,269 in its opening week.

References

External links
 
 
 
 
 

1974 films
1970s psychological thriller films
1970s spy thriller films
British psychological thriller films
British spy thriller films
Films about kidnapping in the United Kingdom
Films based on British novels
Films based on thriller novels
Films directed by Don Siegel
Films set in London
Films produced by Richard D. Zanuck
Films scored by Roy Budd
Universal Pictures films
The Zanuck Company films
1970s English-language films
1970s British films